London Bridge is a 2014 Indian Malayalam-language drama film directed by Anil C. Menon and written by Jinu V. Abraham, starring Prithviraj Sukumaran, Mukesh, Andrea Jeremiah and Nanditha Raj. The film was entirely shot in the United Kingdom. Rahul Raj composed three original songs and left the project owing to scheduling conflicts. Thus Carnatic vocalist Dr. Sreevalsan Menon was hired to compose two additional songs and Gopi Sundar was signed in to compose the background score. The film is produced by Antony Binoy and Sathish B under the banner Ordinary Pictures.

Plot
Vijay Das is a career-oriented businessman in London who always listens to his brain, and Pavitra is the daughter of a famous businessman C. S. Nambiar and always listens to her heart. Vijay was asked to marry Pavitra by Nambiar, and Pavitra is testing whether Vijay is the right guy for her. Driving his way home after spending a day with Pavitra, Vijay hits Merin, a nurse who has just arrived from India to work in London. Her wrist gets paralyzed after the accident. Vijay takes care of her and eventually falls in love with her and vice versa. Nambiar and Vijay's friend Francis fix Vijay's and Pavitra's marriage. But when he refuses to marry her, Francis forces him to marry Pavitra because of her wealth. Merin's job agreement gets terminated because they think that she is physically unfit. Francis tries to help her but fails. Eventually, Francis forces Vijay to not give her false hopes and gift her a sum of money and let her go back to India. Merin refuses the amount of money gifted and asks him to show her around London before she leaves. Then Merin goes back to India. The next day, her relative Gracy calls Vijay to tell that Merin has not reached her home yet. Gracy's husband Thambi Kutty tells them that he will go to India to enquire about Merin, but Vijay says that he will go instead because he is the one who is supposed to go. Francis tries to force him to stay, but Vijay says that he really likes Merin and he will go to India no matter what. Pavitra helps him to go to India by convincing her father to not stop him and personally dropping him at the airport. Vijay reaches India. While in a taxi, Francis calls Vijay and directs him to go to Merin's home. Vijay reaches Merin's home, where he finds out that Merin has reached home safely. But also find out that her house had being seized by a moneylender. When Vijay meets depressed Merin at her room, at that time, Pavitra called Vijay and reveals that Merin had lied to make Vijay realize his love for her. The film ends by showing Vijay and Merin uniting.

Cast
 Prithviraj Sukumaran as Vijay Kannedathu Das
 Andrea Jeremiah as Pavithra
 Nanditha Raj as Merin Elsa John
 Pratap Pothen as C. S. Nambiar
 Mukesh as Advocate Francis Pallipadan
 Sunil Sukhada as Thambi Kutty
 Lena as Gracy
 Amritha Anil as Maalu (Merin's sister)
 Prem Prakash as John Daniel
 Sreehari as Devassikutty
 Devi Krupa as Swathi

Production
London Bridge was started in August 2013 in Central London. The film covers almost every part of London in its shots. The film was earlier planned to release during Onam Festival but since it was not completed yet, the release was postponed to 1 February 2014.

Music

Rahul Raj was signed in as the composer of the film. But after composing the main theme music and two songs, he left the project owing to time constraints and other commitments. Carnatic vocalist Dr. Sreevalsan Menon was hired to compose two additional songs. Rahul Raj was set to return to the project to compose the background score of the movie; but scheduling conflicts with his Telugu film Paathshala forced him to opt out completely. However the main theme music composed by Rahul Raj was retained and used as the opening titles theme.

Release
The film was released on 1 February 2014 at 72 theaters across Kerala and the distribution was done by Central Pictures.

Reception
London Bridge has received mixed reviews from critics, The Malayalam website Muyal Media has rated 3.2/5 stars for London Bridge and mentioned that "London Bridge, a triangular love story happening in London has got a kind of freshness in its visuals but lacks the same in the narrative."

References

External links

2014 films
Indian romantic drama films
Films scored by Sreevalsan J. Menon
Films scored by Rahul Raj
2010s Malayalam-language films
2014 romance films
Films shot in the United Kingdom
Films set in London